The 1922 Kentucky Wildcats football team represented the University of Kentucky as a member of the Southern Conference (SoCon) during the 1923 college football season. Led by William Juneau in his third and final season as head coach, the Wildcats compiled an overall record of 6–3 with a mark of 1–2 in conference play, tying for 11th place in the SoCon.

Schedule

References

Kentucky
Kentucky Wildcats football seasons
Kentucky Wildcats football